Mynydd Moel is the second highest summit of Cadair Idris in the Snowdonia National Park, in Gwynedd, northwest Wales. It lies to the east of Cadair Idris and is often climbed as a horseshoe along with Craig Cwm Amarch and Cadair Idris.

The summit is bare and rocky and marked with a cairn. The north face like Cadair Idris has large cliffs. To the east is a lower broad plateau topped by the summit of Gau Graig.

References

External links
 www.geograph.co.uk : photos of and from Cadair Idris

Dolgellau
Llanfihangel-y-Pennant
Mountains and hills of Gwynedd
Mountains and hills of Snowdonia
Hewitts of Wales
Nuttalls